Fast & Furious 6: Original Motion Picture Soundtrack is the soundtrack to Fast & Furious 6, released digitally to iTunes on May 17, 2013, and on CD on May 21, 2013 by Def Jam Recordings. It mainly features electronic and hip hop tracks.

Lucas Vidal composed the musical score for Fast & Furious 6 since Brian Tyler had other commitments with Iron Man 3 and Thor: The Dark World.

The track "We Own It" by 2 Chainz and Wiz Khalifa reached number six on the UK Singles Chart, becoming 2 Chainz's most successful single in that country.

With the agreement of the record label Axtone (owned by Swedish DJ Axwell from Swedish House Mafia), the tracks "Here We Go" (featuring Swanky Tunes) and "Quasar" by Hard Rock Sofa, a Russian band of DJs, were used in the film.

The Glitch Mob remix of The Prodigy's song Breathe was used in trailers leading up to the release of the film.

Track listing

Charts

References

External links
 http://www.mp3sheriff.net/mp3-Fast-Furious-6.html

Fast & Furious albums
2013 soundtrack albums
Def Jam Recordings soundtracks
Action film soundtracks